The Minahasan languages are a subgroup of the Austronesian languages spoken by the Minahasa people in northern Sulawesi, Indonesia. They belong to the Philippine subgroup.

Considerable lexical influence comes from Spanish, Portuguese, and Ternate, a historical legacy of the presence of foreign powers. The Minahasan languages are distinct from the Manado Malay (Minahasa Malay) language, which is Malayic in origin, and has been displacing the indigenous languages of the area.

Classification
The languages are Tonsawang, Tontemboan, Tondano, Tombulu and Tonsea.

The Minahasan languages are classified as a branch of the Philippine subgroup.

The Bantik, Ratahan, and Ponosakan languages, although also spoken in the Minahasa region, are more distantly related, thus not covered by the term in a genealogical sense.

Reconstruction

Proto-Minahasan (PMin) has been reconstructed by Sneddon (1978). The comparison table (a small selection from ) illustrates the correspondences between the Minahasan languages, including inherited vocabulary as well as Minahasan innovations.

See also
Sangiric languages
Gorontalo–Mongondow languages
Languages of Sulawesi

References

Notes

Bibliography

External links
 Minahasan at Ethnologue (23rd ed., 2020).
 Classification of Sulawesi Languages

Minahasan languages
Philippine languages
Languages of Sulawesi